This is a listing of the horses that finished in either first, second, or third place and the number of starters in the Breeders' Cup Juvenile Fillies, a grade one race run on dirt held on Friday of the Breeders' Cup World Thoroughbred Championships.

 † In 1984, Fran's Valentine won but was disqualified for interference in the stretch and set back to tenth.

See also 
 Breeders' Cup Juvenile Fillies
 Breeders' Cup World Thoroughbred Championships

References 
 Breeders' Cup official website

External links 
Official Breeders' Cup website

Juvenile
Lists of horse racing results